Mitochondrial intermediate peptidase (mitochondrial intermediate precursor-processing proteinase, MIP) is an enzyme. This enzyme catalyses the following chemical reaction

 Release of an N-terminal octapeptide as second stage of processing of some proteins imported into the mitochondrion

This enzyme is a homologue of thimet oligopeptidase.

References

External links 
 

EC 3.4.24